The Butt and Oyster is an old inn on the River Orwell in Pin Mill, Suffolk.

It was listed for preservation in 1989 and English Heritage dated parts of the structure back to the 17th century.  Historical records go back as far as 1456, when a water bailiff held court hearings there.  It was subsequently recorded as a public house in 1553.  Its name may refer to the barrels used to pack and ship oysters or flounders.

The Butt and Oyster is featured in the 1937 children's book We Didn't Mean to Go to Sea by Arthur Ransome, who patronised the inn himself.  It subsequently appeared in the 1950 movie Ha'penny Breeze and the 1993 TV series Lovejoy, in which it was renamed "The Three Ducks".

References

Grade II listed pubs in Suffolk
Timber framed buildings in Suffolk